"Morgen ben ik rijk" (English: "Tomorrow I'll Be Rich") is a song recorded by Dutch rapper Gers Pardoel for his debut studio album, Deze wereld is van jou. It was released on 12 April 2011. The song was co-written by Pardoel and disc jockey Snelle Jelle (Jelle de Boer) and was produced by Snelle Jelle.

Track listing
Digital download
"Morgen ben ik rijk" – 3:12
"Morgen ben ik rijk" (Instrumental Version) - 3:10

Personnel
Songwriting – Gerwin Pardoel, Jelle de Boer
Production – Snelle Jelle

Source:

Charts and certifications

Weekly charts

Release history

References

2011 songs
2011 singles